Shawlands railway station is a railway station serving Shawlands, a suburb of Glasgow, Scotland. The station is managed by ScotRail and is located on the Cathcart Circle Line. It opened in April 1894, when the original line to Cathcart via Queens Park was extended in a loop back towards Glasgow Central. The Cathcart Circle Line has been electrified since 1962 under British Railways.

Services

Up to November 1979 
Two trains per hour between Glasgow Central and Kirkhill and one train per hour in each direction on the Cathcart Circle (Inner and Outer).

From November 1979 
Following the opening of the Argyle Line on 5 November 1979, two trains per hour between Glasgow Central and Kirkhill and two trains per hour in each direction on the Cathcart Circle (Inner and Outer).

From 2006 
One train per hour between Glasgow Central and Kirkhill/Newton and one train per hour in each direction on the Cathcart Circle (Inner and Outer). On Sundays the Cathcart Circle trains do not operate, so only an hourly service is provided in each direction.

Routes

References

Notes

Sources 
 
 
 
 

Railway stations in Glasgow
Former Caledonian Railway stations
Railway stations in Great Britain opened in 1894
SPT railway stations
Railway stations served by ScotRail